Xinqiao is a town of Rong County in southeastern Sichuan province, China, located  southwest of the county seat and roughly equidistant from Leshan to the northwest and Zigong to the east. , it has one residential community (社区) and 8 villages under its administration.

References 

Township-level divisions of Sichuan